EV14 may refer to:
 EV14 Waters of Central Europe, a EuroVelo international cycle route 
 Eurovision Song Contest 2014, a song festival